Gwyrfai was a rural district in the administrative county of Caernarvonshire from 1894 to 1974.

The district was formed under the Local Government Act 1894, taking over the area of the Carnarvon Rural Sanitary District. It was named after the Afon Gwyrfai (a river).

The district as created in 1894 consisted of the following civil parishes:

Bettws Garmon
Clynnog
Llanberis
Llanddeineolan
Llandwrog			
Llanfaglan
Llanfair is Gaer		
Llanllyfni			
Llanrug	
Llanwnda			
Waun Fawr 

In 1934, on the abolition of Glaslyn Rural District, the parish of Beddgelert was added.

The district was abolished in 1974 by the Local Government Act 1972. Beddgelert and Clynnog were included in the district of Dwyfor, with the rest of the rural district becoming part of the Borough of Arfon, both in the new county of Gwynedd.

Sources
Census of England and Wales: County Report for Carnarvonshire, 1901, 1911, 1921
Census of England and Wales: County Report for Caernarvonshire 1931
Caernarvonshire Administrative County (Vision of Britain)

Caernarfonshire
Rural districts of Wales